Portland Fire and Rescue Bureau, also known as the Portland Fire Bureau, and sometimes informally the Portland Fire Department, is the principle fire suppression, prevention, and rescue agency of the City of Portland, Oregon, United States. Oversight of Portland's bureaus shifts among the five City Commissioners. Currently Mayor Ted Wheeler has assigned the Fire Bureau to Commissioner Jo Ann Hardesty.

History
Portland's fire department has its origins in the year 1850. Seeing the need for a more organized firefighting force in the growing community, Oregonian editor Colonel Thomas Dryer began writing editorial pieces in the paper about the need for a volunteer firefighting force. Failing to see a group form, Dryer took the idea into his own hands and recruited a group of 37 men to volunteer for the first firefighting company in Portland; this group became known as the Pioneer Fire Engine Company No. 1. While only having a hand pump to fight fires with, Dryer desired to find funding for a steam engine for his company. In April 1851 Portland was incorporated into a city by the Oregon Territorial Legislature. On May 6, 1851, Dryer offered his company's firefighting services to the City Council. The city council voted to approve Dryer's recommendation. Despite the council's passage of a bill to purchase a steam engine for the company, it was never acquired due to mayor Hugh O'Bryant's refusal to sign the bill.

A new city charter was adopted in 1852 that allowed the Portland to form a city fire department. In May 1853, Dryer was appointed the Chief Warden in charge of the new fire department. A resolution was passed by the city council that stated:
“Resolved. That the whole city be a district for the organization of a Hook and Ladder company; and further, that all that portion of the city lying north of Washington street, be one district for the organization of an engine company and all that part of the city south of that street be another district for the same purpose.”

A fire at a steam mill in 1853 illustrated the need for an organized firefighting force, and on July 29, 1853, the Vigilance Hook and Ladder Company No. 1 was created, consisting of 36 volunteers. On August 6 of the same year 22 volunteers formed the Willamette Engine Company No. 1 covering the Southern District. Willamette Engine Company No. 1 acquired an engine owned by future mayor of Portland, George W. Vaughn and the first engine house in Portland was built on a donated lot on Yamhill Street., bordered by 1st, 2nd, and Morrison. The Portland City Council purchased a hand pump for the company in 1856, which was later replaced by a 2nd Class Amos keag steam apparatus. While these companies together formed the Portland Fire Department, each company had its own by-laws and constitution, and were in many ways operated as separate entities.

On May 22, 1854, the Portland city council passed an ordinance establishing the Portland Fire Department. H. W. Davis was elected as the first "chief engineer" (or chief), replacing the chief warden, and was reelected to the position in 1855 and 1856. On July 4 of the same year, the volunteers of the Portland Fire Department displayed their new uniforms, black pantaloons, red shirts, black cravats, and navy caps. Due to their uniform shirts, people started referring to the firefighters as "redshirts," a name that stuck with them for some time.

In January 1856, the city council ordered that cisterns were to be built under the city streets, in order to provide a water source for the fire department. There were originally nine wooden cisterns throughout the city, measuring 15' by 9'.  These proved to be difficult to upkeep, and the city began using brick for these cisterns.

An attempt had been made in 1853 to put together an engine company for the northern district, however that district never obtained an engine or engine house, and never became an operating company, leaving little historical information about them.  As such, there was no engine company covering the northern district until the Multnomah Engine Company No. 2 was formed on November 26, 1856. Initially using Vaughn's small engine, money was later raised to purchase a Hunneman hand pump engine for this company.

In 1857, businessman S. J. McCormick was elected chief. A reorganization of the department in 1857 brought the Willamette Company no. 1, the Multnomah Engine Company no. 2 and Vigilance Hook and Ladder Company no. 1 into the Portland Fire Department, which thereupon had a total of 157 members (volunteer firefighters). Another reorganization in June 1859 added the Columbia Engine Company no. 3 to the department; it was the first engine company in Portland to use horses. As the city's population grew, additional fire companies were organized, including the Protection Engine Company no. 4, in November 1862; the Tiger Company no. 5, in 1873; and the Couch Engine Company no. 6, in 1880.

While the city was going through a drought, on August 2, 1873, the Great Fire of 1873 broke out at the Hurgren and Shindler furniture shop at the corner of First & Taylor. The alarm bell at the Willamette Fire Company #1 was drowned out by the noise of the fire and not heard. The fire quickly spread, and twelve hours later, twenty-two blocks of the city had been burned.  The cause of the fire was never determined; however, it was suspected that arson was the cause. Due to the alarm not being heard, the city ordered a new alarm bell which could be heard as far away as Oregon City. In 1875 the system was replaced by alarm boxes and engine gongs connected through telegraph wires. In 1879 the members of the department's five companies totaled 375.

Portland Paid Fire Department
In 1883 the Portland Fire Department, while still augmented by volunteers, became known as the Portland Paid Fire Department.  In January of this year, the department submitted it first budget totaling $55,340 for the entire year, with $25,940 being for the annual salary for the department's 52 employees, which included a Chief Engineer, two Assistants, a Secretary and 48 firefighters in five companies. Under this new name, the volunteer companies in the downtown area were replaced by full time firefighters, while the volunteers still responded to alarms and worked side by side with the full time staff.  Unlike today, firefighters during this time did not work shifts and they rarely left or traveled far from their station houses; with many actually living in the fire station.  Paid firefighters worked seven day weeks, getting only 12 hours off during an entire week.

The importance of volunteers expanded in 1891 when Portland consolidated with the cities of East Portland and Albina, more than doubling the size of the city.

In 1904 the department officially became a fully paid fire department, with the temporary firefighters being paid for their time served.  Even still, some outlying areas in the city felt they needed additional protection, and continued to operate volunteer companies, with these companies being provided resources by the city fire department.  Most of these volunteer companies were gone by the 1930s.  The City of Portland provided the funds for the department to purchase their first fire boat, the George H. Williams in 1904.

By 1906 firefighters with the Portland Fire Department had begun wearing turnout gear.  This year also saw Chief Engineer Campbell elected President of the Pacific Coast Fire Chief's Association.  With the automobile becoming more available after the turn of the century, the department began purchasing motorized apparatus in 1909.  1911 saw the department purchase its last horse drawn piece of equipment, enabling the department to become completely motorized by 1920.

Due to the departments ranks being cut after the start of World War II, volunteer firefighting returned to Portland.  While not part of the front line firefighting forces, auxiliary companies were created and given reserve status, with their own company numbers.  Following the end of the War, the auxiliary forces expanded, having their own officers and chiefs through seven districts.  When the city of Portland withdrew from the Federal Civil Defense Administration in 1963, all forms of volunteer firefighting in the city disappeared.

Fire stations and apparatus 

, the department operates out of 31 fire stations strategically located the city.

Legend

Line of duty deaths 
Since the establishment of Portland Fire & Rescue, 75 firefighters have died while on duty or as a result of their job.  Portland firefighters who have died as a result of their occupation are:

References

External links

Fire departments in Oregon
Government of Portland, Oregon
1850 establishments in Oregon Territory